Mel Fitzgerald (born 1952 or 1953) is a Canadian retired Paralympic athlete. He competed in athletics in the 1980 and 1984 Paralympics, winning eight medals. He has used a wheelchair since the age of two, when he was afflicted with polio. He was named a member of the Order of Canada in 1982 and in 2018, he was inducted into the Canadian Wheelchair Sports Association Hall of Fame.

References

Living people
1950s births
Medalists at the 1980 Summer Paralympics
Medalists at the 1984 Summer Paralympics
Paralympic gold medalists for Canada
Paralympic silver medalists for Canada
Paralympic bronze medalists for Canada
Paralympic medalists in athletics (track and field)
Athletes (track and field) at the 1980 Summer Paralympics
Athletes (track and field) at the 1984 Summer Paralympics
Paralympic track and field athletes of Canada
Canadian male wheelchair racers